Simon Peter Nelson (October 2, 1931 – June 18, 2017) was an American mass murderer who was convicted of murdering his six children, aged 12, 10, 8, 7, 6, and 3. He also killed his dog.

Early life 
During his trial, Nelson claimed his father, who committed suicide in 1954, physically abused him as a child. He said he found his father's journal, in which the older man blamed his family for his "despondency."

Murders 
On January 7, 1978, in Rockford, Illinois, after his wife called him to say she wanted a divorce, Nelson used a knife and rubber mallet to kill his children, 12-year-old Jenny, 10-year-old Simon Peter III, 8-year-old Andrew, 7-year-old Matthew, 6-year-old Roseann, and 3-year-old David, while they were asleep. He also slit the throat of the family dog, Pretzel. Pretzel was found lying between two of the children. Nelson then drove to Milwaukee and attacked his wife. As he was beating her, he told her that he had killed the children. Police arrested Nelson midway through the attack.

Nelson's defense team pleaded not guilty by reason of insanity. He said he could not recall the killings, claiming he snapped when his wife called to say she didn't love him anymore and was divorcing him. Nelson's defense failed, and he was convicted of six counts of murder. The prosecution sought a death sentence.

Asking for mercy, Nelson's public defender said "You have to remember that the decision you make today is one you will have to live with for the rest of your life. If electrocuting Simon Peter Nelson will bring back the children, then do it. Or will it be more cruel to make Nelson think about every second, every minute, every hour, every day, every month, and every year for the rest of his life what he did? Yesterday I wouldn't ask for mercy. Today I do."

Nelson was spared execution after the jury deadlocked during the sentencing phase. The jury had voted 11-1 in favor of a death sentence. Nelson was sentenced to six concurrent terms of 100 to 200 years in prison, and officials recommended that he never be released from prison. Under more lenient laws at the time, he became eligible for parole in 1986, but was denied parole 18 times over the remainder of his life.

At a parole hearing in 2004, Nelson said he had benefited from anger management therapy in prison and would never be violent again. He expressed remorse, saying "I almost feel guilty for the fact that I'm regaining my moral compass. I've put myself back together. The remorse that I feel gets deeper the more I learn about what the weaknesses were that allowed this to happen. If I could change history and there not be a crime, that would be my greatest wish. I can't do that. I do apologize to my family and friends, the Rockford community and everyone else that's been hurt by this event."

When the parole board asked Nelson to detail his crimes, he said he only remembered "bits and pieces of sheer horror." He claimed his last memory beforehand was his wife's phone call. "I felt like it was my dad all over again," he said. Nelson claimed he experienced auditory and visual hallucinations and felt his dead father's presence during the crime. "All I remember is being split somehow and my father being present - and again, this is irrational - and me telling him not to go up the stairs," he said. "This was after I had imagined that I killed myself."

At a parole hearing in 2008, Nelson said he didn't know if he deserved parole, but his job as a prison library clerk, which he had held since the 1980s, was proof he could be a productive member of society. "I think that demonstrates that if I can make a commitment to something, I carry it through,” he said. “If you did choose to parole me, you wouldn't have to worry about my life out there, because I would be following Christ. He lives inside me.”

Although one member of board, Craig Findley, credited Nelson for being a model inmate and making a case for his spiritual conversion being genuine, he said he would never vote in favor of his release. "Almost alone among inmates in custody, he deserves to die in prison," Findley said. "There are not many I would say that about. But this is a crime that can't be forgiven. He can never be released."

At a parole hearing in 2014, Nelson repeated his claims that he didn't remember the crime very well and was a sincere Christian.

Nelson was an inmate at Graham Correctional Center in Hillsboro, Illinois. He died in prison on June 18, 2017, aged 85, at St. John's Hospital in Springfield. Nelson had been awaiting another parole hearing at the time of his death. Throughout his nearly 40 years in prison, Nelson, whose projected discharge date was in October 2076, never won a single vote in favor of his release.

See also 

 List of rampage killers (familicides in the United States)

References

1931 births
2017 deaths
1978 murders in the United States
American people convicted of murder
American mass murderers
American murderers of children
American prisoners sentenced to life imprisonment
Prisoners sentenced to life imprisonment by Illinois
Filicides in the United States
People from Rockford, Illinois
Stabbing attacks in the United States
People convicted of murder by Illinois
Massacres in 1978
Massacres in the United States
Prisoners who died in Illinois detention